Johnny Apollo may refer to:

Johnny Apollo (film), a 1940 film starring Tyrone Power and Dorothy Lamour
Johnny Apollo, a childhood friend and later enemy of comic book character Greyshirt